The 1997 1. divisjon, Norway's second-tier football league, began play on 20 April 1997 and ended on 12 October 1997. The league was contested by 14 teams, and the top two teams won promotion to Tippeligaen, while the third placed played a promotion-playoff against the 12th-placed team in Tippeligaen to win promotion. The bottom four teams were relegated to the 2. divisjon.

Vålerenga and Moss won promotion to Tippeligaen, while Eik-Tønsberg lost the promotion-playoff against Tromsø. Runar, Drøbak/Frogn, Harstad and Sarpsborg was relegated to the 2. divisjon.

League table

See also
 1997 Tippeligaen
 1997 2. divisjon
 1997 3. divisjon

References

Norwegian First Division seasons
2
Norway
Norway